Prince Edward  may refer to:

People

 Edward, the Black Prince (1330–1376), eldest son of King Edward III and father of King Richard II
 Edward of Westminster, Prince of Wales (1453–1471), son of King Henry VI of England and Margaret of Anjou
 Edward of Middleham, Prince of Wales, (1474–1484), son of Richard III of England and Anne Neville 
 Prince Edward, Duke of York and Albany (1739–1767), younger brother of King George III
 Prince Edward, Duke of Kent and Strathearn (1767–1820), fourth son of King George III and father of Queen Victoria
 Edward VII of the United Kingdom (1841–1910), eldest son of Queen Victoria
 Edward VIII of the United Kingdom, (1894–1972),  first child and eldest son of George V, later The Prince Edward, Duke of Windsor
 Prince Edward, Duke of Kent (born 1935), cousin of Queen Elizabeth II
 Prince Edward, Duke of Edinburgh (born 1964), youngest child of Queen Elizabeth II
 Prince Edouard de Lobkowicz (1926–2010), Austrian-American diplomat and financier
 Prince Edouard-Xavier de Lobkowicz (1960–1984), French murder victim

Fictional people
 Prince Edward, fiancé to Giselle in the 2007 film Enchanted

Places

 Prince Edward Theatre, West End Theatre in London
 Prince Edward Island, province of Canada
 Prince Edward County, Ontario, single-tier census division of the Canadian province
 Prince Edward (electoral district), a riding for the Canadian House of Commons
 Prince Edward Islands, group of two islands in the sub-Antarctic Indian Ocean
 Prince Edward County, Virginia, United States 
 Prince Edward Road, a major road in Hong Kong, named after Edward VIII
 Prince Edward station, a station next to the road
 Prince Edward, Hong Kong, the area around the station
 Prince Edward Road MRT station, a rapid transit station in Singapore
 Prince Edward School, Zimbabwe

See also
King Edward (disambiguation)